U-ka saegusa IN db IV ~Crystal na Kisetsu ni Miserarete~ is the fourth and last studio album by Japanese group U-ka Saegusa in dB.

Background
The album includes 5 previously released singles since Yukidoke no Ano Kawa no Nagare no You ni till Natsu no Owari ni Anata he no Tegami Kakitometeimasu. The album was released on November 25, 2009 under Giza Studio label. It was released in two versions: a limited CD+DVD edition and a regular CD only edition.

Charting performance
The album reached #33 rank in Oricon for first week. It charted for 2 weeks and totally sold 5,999 copies.

Track listing

References 

2009 albums
Being Inc. albums
Giza Studio albums
Japanese-language albums
U-ka Saegusa in dB albums
Albums produced by Daiko Nagato